The Canon de 164 mm Modèle 1893 was a medium-caliber naval gun used as the secondary armament of a number of French pre-dreadnoughts and armoured cruisers during World War I. It was used as railway artillery in both World Wars and as coastal artillery in World War II.

Description
The 45 caliber Canon de 164 mm Modèle 1893 gun was a typical built-up French heavy gun of its period. It used a Welin interrupted-screw breech and bagged propellant with a de Bange obturator to get a good gas seal during firing. It was replaced by the Mle 1893/96 gun which used a plastic seal for the obturator, differed in the construction of the gun, had a slightly longer barrel of 46.6 calibers and the newer gun was able to fire a new HE shell further than that used by the older gun.

Naval mounts
The Mle 1893 and 1893/96 guns were mounted in casemated pivot mounts with the ability to depress to -10° and elevate to +25°. The guns were also installed in single and twin-gun turrets, although data for the turrets is unavailable.

Naval service
The Mle 1893 was mounted on armored cruisers and pre-dreadnought battleships including:
 Dupleix-class - The primary armament of this class of three armored cruisers consisted of two, Mle 1893 guns, in double turrets, fore and aft.
 Gloire-class - The secondary armament of this class of five armored cruisers consisted of four, Mle 1893 guns, in single casemates, fore and aft.  There were also four guns in single turrets in the center of the ship.
 Gueydon-class - The secondary armament of this class of three armored cruisers consisted of eight, Mle 1893 guns, in single casemates, along the ships centerline.
 Léon Gambetta-class - The secondary armament of this class of three armored cruisers consisted of four, Mle 1893 guns, in single casemates, fore and aft.  There were also twelve guns in six double turrets in the center of the ship.
 République-class - The secondary armament of this class of two pre-dreadnought battleships consisted of eight, Mle 1893 guns, in single casemates, along each side  There were also twelve guns in six double turrets in the center of the ship.

Railroad gun
The French placed a number of spare Mle 1893 guns on four-axle railroad carriages in 1915 to use as mobile heavy artillery under the designation Canon de 164 modèle 1893/96 TAZ. It could traverse a full 360° if its outriggers, two per side, were deployed. Photographic evidence shows that some mounts had built-up cargo compartments at both ends of the mount, which limited the gun's firing arc to approximately 90° on each side. It had a circular platform for the crew that had to be folded up for travel. Some guns were fitted with gun shields. It shared its railroad carriage with the 164 mm Mle 1893/96 M and the Canon de 19 modèle 1870/93 TAZ.

The gun could elevate to a maximum of 36°, but the minimum firing angle was 10°.

The gun could elevate between +3° and 40°, but retained the same minimum firing elevation of 10°. Eight of these railroad guns remained in French service after the end of World War I and at least four were captured by the Germans and given the designation 16 cm Kanone (E.) 453(f) although what use was made of them, if any, is unknown.

Coastal gun
The Germans used 32 of the Mle 1893/96 in coast-defence batteries in France as the KM 93/96(f), as well as 18 of the Mle 1893 with the designation of SKL/45(f), although it is unknown how many, if any, were simply taken over from existing French coast-defence positions or were newly emplaced by them.

Notes

References

 
 Hogg, Ian V. Allied Artillery of World War One. Ramsbury, Marlborough, Wiltshire: Crowood Press, 1998 
 Kosar, Franz. Eisenbahngeschütz der Welt. Stuttgart: Motorbook, 1999

External links 

 PIECES MOYENNES : 120 à 239
 French 164.7 mm/45 (6.5") Models 1893 and 1896
 http://octant.u-bourgogne.fr/portail/documentsafb///PLANS/01PL05586/PDF/01PL05586.pdf

Naval guns of France
164 mm artillery